Sue, Suzanne, Suzan or Susan Johnson may refer to:

Writers
Susan Johnson (American novelist) (born 1939), romance author
Susan Johnson (Australian author) (born 1956), novelist and non-fiction writer
Susan Lee Johnson, American historian and academic since 1980s
Suzan Johnson Cook (born 1957), American presidential advisor, pastor, author and academic
Sue Johnson, English clinical psychologist and couples therapist working in Canada since 1980s
Susan Johnson (filmmaker) (born 1970), American film producer and director

Others
Susan Johnson (actress) (1927–2003), American musical theatre actress, a/k/a Susan Johnson-Kehn
Suzanne Nora Johnson (born 1957), American corporate lawyer and executive
Susan Johnson (bishop), Canadian Evangelical Lutheran Church National Bishop National Bishop since 2007
Susan Johnson, Miss Minnesota 1988, American beauty pageant titleholder
Susan Johnson (swimmer) (born 1969), American Olympian in 1988, a/k/a Susan Lipscomb
Suzanne Bennett Johnson, American psychologist
Susan Johnson (politician), American politician

See also
Sue Johnston (born 1943), English TV actress
Suzanne Johnston (born 1958), Australian operatic mezzo-soprano
Susan Johnstone (1792–1850), English-American actress